Sialkot Fort is one of the oldest forts in Pakistan. The city of Sialkot, which is one of the oldest cities of Pakistan, has historical significance due to the fort.  Historian Diayas Jee has stated that Raja Sálbán re-established Sialkot city around the 2nd century CE. and ruled over the area between the rivers Ravi and Chenab. Sálbán built the Sialkot Fort in two years (which, at the time, had double walls) for the defense of the city. Raja Sálbán, supposedly, used more than 10,000 laborers and masons for the repair and extension of the Fort with stone slabs and rocks which were brought to the location from Lahore.

Mahmud Ghaznavi captured the fort in 1008 from the Hindu Shahis. From 1179 to 1186, Shahab ud-Din Ghori ruled Lahore and Sindh. With the help of the Raja of Jammu, he captured the Sialkot Fort. The Sialkot Fort was given to the Janjua tribes by Sultan Firuz Shah Tughluq who accepted their suzerainty in that region around late 14th century CE.

Rashid Niaz, another historian who has authored Tareekh-i-Sialkot, has written that the second wall of the ancient Sialkot Fort was discovered by the Sialkot Municipal Corporation in 1923 while carrying out civil works in the city. At that time, archaeology experts from Taxila and Delhi visited Sialkot and confirmed that the stone wall (faseel) was 5,000 years old. Later, that wall was re-buried.

At present, few ruins, including a bastion, are all that is left of the Fort. Among the many ills plaguing it is the growing number of encroachments which are a blot on its face. The offices of the district government are located on the premises of the Fort. And Sialkot name came with raja Sial name

See also

 Sialkot

References

Archaeological sites in Punjab, Pakistan
Forts in Punjab, Pakistan
Buildings and structures in Sialkot
Tourist attractions in Sialkot